Sebba is a department or commune of Yagha Province in Burkina Faso. Its capital is the town of Sebba.

References 

Departments of Burkina Faso
Yagha Province